Macedonians of Serbia are an officially recognized ethnic minority in Serbia.

History
The first session of the Anti-fascist Assembly for the National Liberation of Macedonia (ASNOM) was held on 2 August 1944, the anniversary of the Ilinden Uprising, at Prohor Pčinjski Monastery in the Bulgarian occupation zone of Yugoslavia, what is today southern Serbia, just north of the Macedonian border. The Assembly declared Macedonia the nation-state of Macedonians within Yugoslavia. The monastery which is in the region of Macedonia, was ceded after WWII to SR Macedonia, but was transferred to SR Serbia in 1947. 

In Bukles, Vojvodina, a center for refugees of the Greek Civil War was established in May 1945 through 1949. Among the refugees settled here were ethnic Macedonians.

During the years 1945–1991 ethnic Macedonians and the Macedonian language were a constituent part of the Socialist Federal Republic of Yugoslavia.  Some ethnic Aromanians and particularly Megleno-Romanians from the Socialist Republic of Macedonia emigrated to the Serbian Banat and settled in villages such as Gudurica to repopulate them after the expulsion of their native German populations following World War II. As they were not recognized as a separate ethnic minority, they were counted simply as Macedonians and assimilated quickly. However, the Megleno-Romanian minority of Gudurica has not yet gone extinct, since as of 2014, 3 Megleno-Romanian-speakers remained in the village.

Many Macedonians, due to economic reasons, migrated during the 1960s and 1970s to the Socialist Republic of Serbia (predominantly in Vojvodina). In 2004, Serbia and Macedonia signed an inter-state agreement on the protection of Macedonians in Serbia and Serbs in Macedonia.

Demographics
According to the 2011 census there were 22,755 Macedonians in Serbia. The Macedonian population living in Serbia is concentrated in two cities, Belgrade and Pančevo. In Belgrade there are 6,970 Macedonians, while in neighboring Pančevo 4,558 - out of which vast majority live in three villages (Jabuka, Glogonj, and Kačarevo) that are within administrative limits of City of Pančevo. Additionally, Macedonians constitute significant population in Plandište municipality, especially in village of Dužine.

Vojvodina
Macedonians in selected South Banat settlements per Yugoslav and Serb censuses:

Politics
In 2005 Macedonians in Serbia also established a National Minority Council, which represents as a step towards safeguarding their interests. Jovo Radevski was elected as its president. The Democratic Party of Macedonians is the primary minority party. It is centered in Novi Sad.

Culture
Macedonian language is in the official use in the municipality of Plandište, where Macedonians constitute 9.2% of population. Macedonian-language print media consists primarily of the monthly political journal Makedonska videlina produced by the Macedonian Information and Publishing Centre in Pančevo. Limited Macedonian-language television is available through regional public broadcaster of Radio Television of Vojvodina and the local station TV Pančevo.

Associations such as "The Society of Serbian and Macedonian Friendship Šar – planina" seated in Belgrade, and the "Municipal Society of Serbian-Macedonian Friendship" seated in Zrenjanin cover issues related to ethnic, cultural and economic cooperation in Serbia.

Notable people

Academia & Arts
 Tijana Dapčević (born 1976), singer and actress
 Aleksandar Džambazov (1936–2022), conductor and composer
 Bogomil Gjuzel (1939–2021), poet, writer, playwright and translator
 Vladimir Gligorov (1945–2022), economist
 Zafir Hadžimanov (1943–2021), musician
 Maja Odžaklievska (born 1954), singer
 Lazar Ristovski (born 1952), actor, producer, director, and writer
 Nemanja Todorović Štiplija (born 1984), political scientist, heraldic, and social activist

Sport
 Dragan Čadikovski (born 1982), footballer
 Boško Gjurovski (born 1961), footballer, football manager, and politician
 Aleksandar Ignjovski (born 1991), footballer
 Igor Jančevski (born 1974), footballer
 Aleksandar Kirovski (born 1990), footballer
 Dragan Lukovski (born 1975), basketball player
 Nemanja Matić (born 1988), footballer
 Uroš Matić (born 1990), footballer
 Aleksandar Lazevski (born 1988), footballer
 Marko Pavlovski (born 1994), footballer
 Predrag Ranđelović (born 1990), footballer
 Dragoslav Šekularac (1937–2019), footballer and manager
 Goran Simov (born 1975), footballer
 Perica Stančeski (born 1985), footballer
 Milan Stojanoski (born 1973), footballer and manager
 Aleksandar Todorovski (born 1984), footballer

See also

North Macedonia-Serbia relations
Serbs in North Macedonia

References

External links
 www.mhrmi.org-Website for Macedonian International Rights
 Association of Macedonians from Vranje
 Democratic Party of Macedonians

Serbia
Ethnic groups in Serbia
Macedonian diaspora